Lana is the debut studio album by Croatian singer Lana Jurčević. It was released in 2003, by Croatia Records. The album contains 10 songs. Milana Vlaović wrote all the songs.

Track listing 

 Rođena da budem prva
 Na pola
 Tvoja bivša
 Otvori srce
 Samo za tvoje oči
 Preboli me
 Što mi vrijedi sve
 Otrov
 Sada je kasno
 Za sve

References

2003 debut albums
Croatia Records albums
Croatian-language albums
Albums produced by Milana Vlaović
Lana Jurčević albums